Mewahang (Meohang), or Newahang, is a Kiranti language spoken in Nepal. The eastern and western dialects are structurally distinct.

Distribution and dialects
Western Mewahang is spoken in the upper Arun valley west of the Arun River in Sankhuwasabha District, Kosi Zone, in the villages of Bala, Yamdang, Tamku, and Sisuwa (Ethnologue).
The Bala dialect is spoken in Bala village, Sankhuwasabha VDC.
The Bumdemba dialect is spoken in Sishuwakhola VDC.

Eastern Mewahang is spoken in Mangtewa, Yaphu, and Choyang VDC's of Sankhuwasabha District, Kosi Zone (Ethnologue). It is spoken in the upper Arun valley east of the Arun River.

The Sunsari dialect is spoken Bhaludhunga and Bishnupaduka VDC's of Sunsari District.
The Dibum (Dibung) dialect is spoken in Mangtewa VDC
The Mulgaon-Wangtang dialect is spoken in Yaphu VDC.

Further reading
Gerber, Pascal; Selin Grollmann (2020). A field report on Sam Rai (Kiranti). ICSTLL 53.
Bickel, Balthasar/Martin Gaenszle (2015). ‘First person objects, antipassives, and the political history of the Southern Kirant’. In: Journal of South Asian Languages and Linguistics 2.1. 63–86.
van Driem, George (2001). Languages of the Himalayas. An Ethnolinguistic Handbook of the Greater Himalayan Region. 2 vols. Leiden/Boston/Köln: Brill.
Gaenszle, Martin (2000). Origins and Migrations. Kinship, Mythology and Ethnic Identity among the Mewahang Rai of East Nepal. Kathmandu: Mandala Book Point.
Hanßon, Gerd (1991). The Rai of Eastern Nepal: Ethnic and Linguistic Grouping. Findings of the Linguistic Survey of Nepal. Kirtipur: Linguistic Survey of Nepal/Centre for Nepal/Asian Studies, Tribhuvan University.

References

Kiranti languages
Languages of Nepal
Languages of Koshi Province